Cimahi is a landlocked city located immediately west of the larger city of Bandung, in West Java Province, Indonesia and within the Bandung Metropolitan Area. It covers an area of 40.37 km2 and had a population at the 2010 Census of 541,177 and at the 2020 Census of 568,400; the official estimate as at mid 2021 was 571,632. The city is a major textile producer, and is home to several military training centres.

Geography

Cimahi, located 180 km south east of Jakarta, is situated between Bandung and West Bandung Regency. Cimahi comprises three districts (kecamatan), which in turn are sub-divided into fifteen urban villages (kelurahan). The Cimahi River flows through the city and Cimahi also has two Springs, named Cikuda and Cisontok.

Climate
Cimahi has an elevation moderated tropical rainforest climate (Af) with moderate rainfall from June to September and heavy rainfall from October to May.

History
The name Cimahi was taken from the Cimahi river that flows through the city. The word originated from the Sundanese language and literally means "enough water". Residents of Cimahi get their water supply from the river.

Cimahi's prominence increased in 1811, when Governor-General Herman Willem Daendels constructed the Great Post Road. A checkpoint, known as Loji, was built in Cimahi Square. Between 1874 and 1893, the Cimahi rail station and a railroad connecting Bandung and Cianjur was built. The building of military training centers and other military buildings was started in 1886. Cimahi was granted district status in 1935. In 1975, Cimahi became the first administrative city in West Java and the third in Indonesia. Cimahi was then granted full city status in 2001.

Administrative districts
The city of Cimahi is divided into three administrative districts (Indonesian: kecamatan), tabulated below with their areas and their populations at the 2010 Census and the 2020 Census. An elected mayor leads the city administration. The table also includes the location of the district administration, the number of administrative villages (urban kelurahan) in each district and its post codes.

Tourism

Cimahi has various tourist hotspots, such as Alam Wisata Cimahi, Pandiga Recreation Sport, Rumah Pajang, Lembur Batik and Kampung Adat Cirendeu. According to the local tourist office, these offer distinctive experiences in nature, cuisine, handicrafts and traditional community. Additionally, there are some buildings of historical interest, such as Dustira Hospital, Ereveld Cemetery, Military Prison and Sudirman Building.

Notable people
 Amirmachmud, former military general and politician
 Jack Jersey Music producer, composer, lyricist, arranger and singer.
 Anthony Sinisuka Ginting, Indonesian badminton player.
 Sule, comedian
 Maria Hertogh, born in Tjimahi and the person at the centre of the Maria Hertogh riots

References

External links

 

 
Populated places in West Java